Kefalonia Airport "Anna Pollatou"  is an airport on the island of Kefalonia, in Greece. It is located in the southwest of the island, 8 km away from the capital Argostoli.

History
The airport opened in 1971 to serve the former municipality Leivathos with improved transportation links; Kefalonia is now a single municipality. A new runway and the current terminal building were constructed in the 1980s.

In December 2015, the privatization of Kefalonia Airport and 13 other regional airports of Greece was finalized with the signing of the agreement between the Fraport AG/Copelouzos Group joint venture and the state privatisation fund. "We signed the deal today," the head of Greece's privatisation agency HRADF, Stergios Pitsiorlas, told Reuters. According to the agreement, the joint venture will operate the 14 airports (including Kefallinia International Airport) for 40 years as of April 2017.

The new operator completed a major upgrade of the airport's facilities, including constructing a new terminal building that replaced the outdated existing one. Upgrades included new check-in desks and security lanes, larger airside space with more shops, new carousels for arrivals and extra car-hire companies. Work has also been completed on the car park and pick-up/drop-off points outside the terminal building. Due to the COVID-19 pandemic, many flights to the airport were suspended for 2020, although flights from Europe are gradually restarting.

Airlines and destinations
The following airlines operate regular scheduled and charter flights at Kefalonia Airport:

Traffic figures

The data is taken from the official website of the airport.

Traffic statistics by country (2022)

Ground transport
KTEL runs a limited bus service between the airport and Argostoli.

See also
Transport in Greece

References

External links

Kefalonia Airport (official website)
 
 

Airports in Greece
Airports established in 1971
Cephalonia
Transport in the Ionian Islands (region)